The Old Post Office is a historic building in Pullman, Washington listed on the National Register of Historic Places as U.S. Post Office-Pullman. The building served as Pullman's post office until 1975, when a new post office was constructed. The Old Post Office subsequently hosted various businesses, including a movie theater, a bakery, and a gun store. In 2002, a new owner began restoration of the building, leading to its NRHP listing in 2003. In 2005, the Old Post Office was home to a wine shop, a wine bar, a winery, and a café. , the building is the home of Paradise Creek Brewery, a microbrewery and brewpub.

References

External links

Government buildings completed in 1930
Buildings and structures in Pullman, Washington
Post office buildings on the National Register of Historic Places in Washington (state)
National Register of Historic Places in Whitman County, Washington